The Indiana Hoosiers baseball team is the varsity intercollegiate athletic team of Indiana University Bloomington in Bloomington, Indiana, United States. The team competes in the National Collegiate Athletic Association's Division I and are members of the Big Ten Conference.  The team plays at Bart Kaufman Field, which opened for the 2013 season.

In conference postseason play, Indiana has won four Big Ten Conference baseball tournaments and made eight NCAA Regionals appearances, including one College World Series appearance in 2013. In regular season play, the Hoosiers have won seven Big Ten Conference titles.

History

Coach Andres, Lawrence, and Smith Eras (1949–1983)

In 1949, the Hoosiers hired Indiana University alum and former MLB third baseman Ernie Andres to manage the team. Andres would eventually become the longest serving head coach of IU baseball, to date, amassing a 388-367-3 overall record (129-209 conference record) during his 25-year tenure. Andres' Hoosiers would capture one Big Ten conference championship, while also finishing third or better in conference standings three times.

In 1974, Bob Lawrence replaced longtime-tenured coach Ernie Andres. In seven seasons with the Hoosiers, Lawrence compiled a 132–164 overall record (44-71 conference record); Lawrence never led Indiana to a post-season appearance, with his highest conference final standing of third place occurred in 1976.

In 1981, Larry Smith replaced Bob Lawrence as head coach for the Hoosiers. During Smith's three-year tenure at Indiana, he compiled a 74-74-1 overall record (13-30 conference record) and never achieved a post-season appearance.

Coach Bob Morgan Era (1984–2005)

In 1984, Bob Morgan replaced Larry Smith as head coach of the Hoosiers. Morgan would take the Hoosiers to five Big Ten Conference baseball tournaments and one appearance in the NCAA Regionals. Indiana would lose in the opening round of the 1996 NCAA Midwest Regional to Wichita State, 4–0. Morgan would finish his career with Indiana in 2005, with an overall record of 782–499–4 in 21 years of managing the team as the second-longest tenured coach in Hoosiers' history.

Coach Tracy Smith Era (2006–2014)

On June 23, 2005, Indiana replaced long-time coach Bob Morgan with former Miami (OH) head coach Tracy Smith.

The Hoosiers would eventually lose 1–0 to Oregon State in the second round. Consequently, the 2013 roster would also notably include future-Chicago Cubs player Kyle Schwarber and his eventual selection in the 2014 Major League Baseball draft.

Following the conclusion of the 2014 season, then-head coach Tracy Smith was hired by Arizona State to the same position. In nine years as head coach of the Hoosiers, Smith finished with a 287–237 overall record (127–111 conference record), two Big Ten Baseball Championships and three NCAA Regionals, including one College World Series appearance in 2013.

Coach Chris Lemonis Era (2015–2018)

On July 24, 2014, the Indiana Hoosier's Athletic Department hired former Louisville assistant coach Chris Lemonis to replace Smith as head coach. On June 25, 2018, Mississippi State confirmed that it had hired Lemonis as their new head baseball coach, formally ending Lemonis' tenure with the Hoosiers. Lemonis compiled a 141–91–2 overall record, 55–37-1 conference record and three NCAA Tournament appearances, while head coach of the Hoosiers.

Coach Jeff Mercer Era (2019-Present)

On July 2, 2018, Indiana University Athletics announced the hiring of former Wright State head coach Jeff Mercer, to the head coaching position for the Hoosiers. Mercer would then make a notable acquisition to the Hoosiers' coaching staff on July 18, 2018 with the hiring of former-MLB All Star third baseman Scott Rolen as Director of Player Development.

On May 18, 2019, the Hoosiers became the 2019 Big Ten regular season champions, following their win over Rutgers by a score of 13–3. Indiana would finish the regular season 36–19 overall and 17–7 in conference play.

Following the culmination of the regular season, on May 21, 2019, Jeff Mercer was named Big Ten Coach of the Year. With the award, Mercer became the third Hoosier manager to be bestowed the honor.

On March 12, 2020 it was announced that the remainder of the 2020 season would be cancelled, due to the COVID-19 virus outbreak.

Conference affiliations
Independent (1895–1905, 1943)
Big Ten Conference (1906–1942, 1944–present)
Known as the Big Nine Conference from 1906 to 1917

Home fields

Jordan Field (1887–1950)
Created in 1887, Indiana's first athletic grounds, Jordan Field was originally named University Athletic Field before being renamed in 1898, in honor of then-Indiana University President David Starr Jordan. The field was a mixed-use facility utilized by both the football and baseball teams. Bleacher seating for 4,000 persons were added in 1901, with field drainage added the following year to alleviate flooding.

In 1904, a track and field component was added to the athletic facility; however, conditions of the field continued to be a problem for the Hoosiers. The track and field portion of Jordan Field was upgraded in 1915. The final varsity athletic event for Jordan Field, a baseball game, would occur in 1950 prior to the facility being turned into a parking lot for the nearby Indiana Memorial Union.

Sembower Field (1951–2012)

Sembower Field was the main baseball stadium utilized by the Hoosiers from 1951 to 2012. It was named after former Indiana baseball player Charles Sembower. The stadium was located just north of the Foster Quadrangle dormitory on Fee Lane, less than 1 mile southeast of the current Hoosier baseball facility: Bart Kaufman Field. The former site of Sembower Field is presently used as a recreational sports complex for university students.

Bart Kaufman Field (2013–Present)

Bart Kaufman Field is the home of the Hoosiers and is located in Bloomington, Indiana, on the campus of Indiana University. Indiana alumnus Bart Kaufman (1960–1962) pledged $2.5 million to start construction on the facility, with the rest of the funding coming from private donations and the university. Construction of Bart Kaufman Field was completed in March 2013 and formally dedicated on April 26. Bart Kaufman Field hosted its first Big Ten baseball tournament from May 24 through 28, 2017.

Notable players

Current and former Major League Baseball players

 Ernie Andres
 Caleb Baragar (Arizona Diamondbacks)
 Ralph Brickner
 John Corriden
 Doug DeVore
 Alex Dickerson (Atlanta Braves)
 Jake Dunning
 Scott Effross (New York Yankees)
 Sammy Esposito
 Kyle Hart (Boston Red Sox)
 Micah Johnson
 Barry Jones
 Ron Keller
 Ted Kluszewski
 Mike Kosman
 Kevin Mahar
 Pinky May
 Zach McClellan
 Bruce Miller
 Mike Modak
 Mickey Morandini
 Kevin Orie
 Chris Peters
 Josh Phegley
 Kyle Schwarber (Philadelphia Phillies)
 Mike Simon
 Aaron Slegers
 Jonathan Stiever (Chicago White Sox)
 Sam Travis
 Kermit Wahl
 John Wehner
 Bob Wellman
 Whitey Wilshere

Major League Baseball All-Stars

Notable Drafted Players

Year-by-year results
Below is a table of the program's yearly records.

Championships

Conference Regular Season Championships

Conference Tournament Championships

Honors & Awards

National Awards

Sporting News National Player of the Year 
 Mike Smith (1992)

NCBWA National Player of the Year 
 Mike Smith (1992)

NCAA Triple Crown Winner 
 Mike Smith (1992)

ABCA/Rawlings Gold Glove 
 Tony Butler, 2B (2016)

NCBWA National Coach of the Year 
 Tracy Smith (2013)

All-Americans

Conference Awards

Big Ten Player of the Year 

 Mike Smith (1992)
 Kennard Jones (2002)
 Alex Dickerson (2010)
 Sam Travis (2014)

Big Ten Pitcher of the Year 

 Eric Arnett (2009)
 Aaron Slegers (2013)
 Joey DeNato (2014)
 Andrew Saalfrank (2019)

Big Ten Coach of the Year 

 Bob Morgan (1991,1993)
 Tracy Smith (2013, 2014)
 Jeff Mercer (2019)

Big Ten Freshman of the Year 

 Alex Dickerson (2009)
 Sam Travis (2012)

See also
 Indiana Hoosiers
 List of Indiana University professional athletes

References

External links